The 1994 Nippon Professional Baseball season was the 45th season of operation for the league. The Central League championship was decided by the final game of the year between the Chunichi Dragons and the Yomiuri Giants.

Regular season standings

Central League

Pacific League

Japan Series

See also
1994 Major League Baseball season

References

 
1994 in baseball
1994 in Japanese sport